"Night of the Long Grass" is a song by English rock band the Troggs, released as a single in May 1967. It continued their slight dip in chart performance, though still became their sixth top-twenty hit in the UK.

Background and release
Originally towards the end of April 1967, the next Troggs single was announced as "My Lady" backed with "Girl in Black". However, a week before its release, it was announced that they would be changing the A-side and instead release "Night of the Long Grass" as a single. As "My Lady" was withdrawn so soon before its expected release, according to Reg Presley, around 26,000 copies had already been pressed. It was given a release in South Africa as was also "Night of the Long Grass", with the latter backed with "Hi Hi Hazel". "My Lady" was later included on the Troggs album Cellophone and a cover by Jet Harris was released as a single in July 1967.

Reviewing for Record Mirror, Peter Jones described "Night of the Long Grass" as "much stronger than the mooted "My Lady" single – in fact, it becomes darned infectious after just a couple of plays. Lyrics worth a close listen, with atmospheric guitar and percussion backing… and the vocal comes through as if hidden behind a wall of bricks or grass or something. Curious vocals sounds behind, too". Guest reviewing for Disc and Music Echo, Dusty Springfield wrote "What a creepy beginning! And a lovely, sexy, sinister vocal from Reg. On first hearing though, it's not as catchy as some of their others but it's got lots of nice ideas and their popularity will see it into the chart I'm sure".

Charts

References

1967 singles
The Troggs songs
Songs written by Reg Presley
1967 songs